Vilankurichi is a neighbourhood in Coimbatore city in the Indian state of Tamil Nadu, which is recently merged with the Corporation of Coimbatore. Vilankurichi is the IT hub of Coimbatore. Neighbouring places are Peelamedu, Ganapathy, Gandhimanagar, Cheranmanagar,  Kalapatti, Saravanampatti.Major Bank in the area is Canara Bank located at Cheran Managar.

Demographics
 India census, Vilankurichi had a population of 9122. Males constitute 51% of the population and females 49%. Vilankurichi has an average literacy rate of 78%, higher than the national average of 59.5%; male literacy is 83%, and female literacy is 73%. In Vilankurichi, 11% of the population is under 6 years of age.

References

Neighbourhoods in Coimbatore